Elasticity often refers to:

Elasticity (physics), continuum mechanics of bodies that deform reversibly under stress

Elasticity may also refer to:

Information technology 
 Elasticity (data store), the flexibility of the data model and the clustering
 Elasticity (cloud computing), a defining feature of cloud computing

Economics 
Elasticity (economics), a general term for a ratio of change. For more specific economic forms of elasticity, see:
 Beta (finance)
Cross elasticity of demand
Elasticity of substitution
Frisch elasticity of labor supply
Income elasticity of demand
Output elasticity
Price elasticity of demand
Price elasticity of supply
Yield elasticity of bond value

Mathematics 
Elasticity of a function, a mathematical definition of point elasticity
Arc elasticity

Other uses 
 Elasticity, a 2021 EP by Serj Tankian
 Elasticity coefficient, a biochemical term used in metabolic control analysis

See also 
 Elastic (disambiguation)